Innerdalsvatnet is a lake in Tynset Municipality in Innlandet county, Norway. It is a significant part of the Orkla watershed. The northwest end of the lake has a large dam on it to control the level of the water for hydropower. The dam is actually located on the municipal and county border.

See also
List of lakes in Norway

References

Tynset
Lakes of Innlandet